"Humpin' Around" is a song by American singer Bobby Brown. It is rumored that the song was originally titled "Fuckin' Around", with the name later changed to make it more radio friendly, and to avoid potential censorship. The song contains an interpolation of "Dancing Days" by Led Zeppelin.

"Humpin' Around" spent two weeks at number one on the US Billboard Hot R&B Singles chart and reached number three on the Billboard Hot 100. Worldwide, the single reached number one in Australia, number two in New Zealand, number five in Spain and Sweden, and the top 10 in at least seven other countries.

In 1995, British electronic music group K-Klass remixed the song and released it following the success of their remix of Brown's "Two Can Play That Game". This new version saw the song reach the UK top 10 for the first time, peaking at number eight on the UK Singles Chart, and it was also included on Brown's 1995 remix album, Two Can Play That Game.

Critical reception
James Hamilton from British magazine Music Weeks RM Dance Update described the 1995 K-Klass remix as a "three years old hit totally revamped as a superb melodically whined Michael Jackson-ish strider".

Music videos
The music video for the song features Brown dancing outside with women in cages, with cut scenes of a girl trying to break in to his phone and personal belongings to find his mistress in NYC. A second video was shot primarily outside for the dance remix, along with random shots and outtakes from the original video.

Track listing

Personnel
 Bobby Brown: lead vocals, songwriter, rap
 Jan C. "Stylz" Styles: songwriter, rap
 Thomas Keyes: songwriter
 Babyface: songwriter, producer, arranger, keyboards, synthesized bass, drum programming, background vocals
 L.A. Reid: songwriter, producer, arranger, drum programming
 Daryl Simmons: songwriter, producer, arranger, background vocals
 Donald Parks: drum programming, MIDI and Synclavier programming
 Emanuel Officer: background vocals

Charts

Weekly chartsOriginal version1995 K-Klass remixYear-end chartsOriginal version'

Decade-end charts

Certifications

Release history

See also
 List of number-one singles in Australia during the 1990s
 List of number-one R&B singles of 1992 (U.S.)

References

1992 singles
1992 songs
1995 singles
Bobby Brown songs
MCA Records singles
Number-one singles in Australia
Song recordings produced by Babyface (musician)
Song recordings produced by Daryl Simmons
Song recordings produced by L.A. Reid
Songs written by Babyface (musician)
Songs written by Daryl Simmons
Songs written by L.A. Reid